Arthur Hayes (17 April 1923 – 7 November 1999) was a South African cricketer. He played in twenty-three first-class matches for Border from 1950/51 to 1954/55.

See also
 List of Border representative cricketers

References

External links
 

1923 births
1999 deaths
South African cricketers
Border cricketers
People from Queenstown, South Africa
Cricketers from the Eastern Cape